Ocularia grisea is a species of beetle in the family Cerambycidae. It was described by Stephan von Breuning in 1958. It is known from the Ivory Coast and the Democratic Republic of the Congo.

References

Oculariini
Beetles described in 1958
Taxa named by Stephan von Breuning (entomologist)